A thief is a person  who takes another person's property or services without consent.

Thief or thieves may also refer to:

Games 
Thief (series), a video game series
 Thief: The Dark Project, the first in the series
 Thief II: The Metal Age, the second in the series
 Thief: Deadly Shadows, the third in the series
 Thief (2014 video game), a reboot of the Thief franchise
Thief (arcade game), a 1981 arcade video game
Thief (Apple II game), a 1982 computer game for the Apple II
Thief (character class), a common character in role-playing games

Film and television 
The Thief (1914 film), an American silent film
The Thief (1920 film), a film by Fox Film
The Thief (1947 film), a Mexican comedy film
The Thief (1952 film), an American black-and white Cold War spy film starring Ray Milland
The Thieves (1959 film), an Italian-Spanish comedy film
Thieves (1977 film), an American film
Thief (film), a 1981 American crime film, directed by Michael Mann, starring James Caan
The Thief (1997 film), a Russian film directed by Pavel Chukhrai
Thieves (1996 film), a French film
Street Thief (2006 film), a documentary-style fictional film
The Thieves, a 2012 South Korean film
Thief (TV series), an FX Networks television series which debuted in 2006
Thieves, a 2001 American television series
Thieves (play), a 1974 play by Herb Gardner
The Thief and the Cobbler, an unfinished animated film by Richard Williams

Literature 
The Thief (Turner novel), a 1996 novel by Megan Whalen Turner
The Thief (novella), a 2006 short novel by Ruth Rendell
The Thief (Clive Cussler novel), a 2012 novel by Clive Cussler and Justin Scott
The Thief, a 2012 novel by Fuminori Nakamura

Music 
 Thieves (band), a 1990s British pop duo

Albums 
 Thief (Destroyer album) or the title song, 2000
 Thief (soundtrack), by Tangerine Dream, from the 1981 film
 Thief (Dan Mangan album), 2020
 The Thief (album), by Floater, or the title song, 2018
 Thieves (album), by British India, 2008
 Thieves (EP), by Shearwater, 2005

Songs 
 "Thief" (Camouflage song), 1999
 "Thief" (Our Lady Peace song), 2000
 "Thief", by Ansel Elgort, 2017
 "Thief", by Caligula's Horse from The Tide, the Thief & River's End, 2013
 "Thief", by Can, 1970
 "Thief", by Ookay, 2016
 "The Thief", by Relient K from Apathetic EP, 2005
 "Thief", by Third Day from Third Day, 1996
 "Thieves" (Ministry song), 1989
 "Thieves" (She & Him song), 2010
 "Thieves", by Rascal Flatts from Back to Us, 2017

Profession
Thief in law
Thief-taker

Places
 The Thief, a luxury waterfront hotel in Oslo, Norway
Thief River Falls, Minnesota

Other uses 
 Thief knot
 Gentleman thief
 Whiskey thief, tool used by master distillers for sampling
 Wine thief, tool used by winemakers

See also
Burglary
Pickpocketing